Baron Axel Fredrik Cronstedt (/kroonstet/ 23 December 1722 – 19 August 1765) was a Swedish mineralogist and chemist who discovered the element nickel in 1751 as a mining expert with the Bureau of Mines.  
Cronstedt is considered a founder of modern mineralogy, for introducing the blowpipe as a tool for mineralogists, and for proposing that the mineral kingdom be organized on the basis of chemical analysis in his book Försök  til  mineralogie,  eller  mineral-rikets upställning (“An attempt at mineralogy or arrangement of the  Mineral Kingdom”, 1758).

Life
Axel Fredrik Cronstedt was born on 23 December 1722 on the estate of Ströpsta, in Sudermania.
His father, Gabriel Olderman Cronstedt (1670–1757), was a military engineer.
His mother, Maria Elizabeth Adlersberg, was Gabriel Cronstedt's second wife.

Beginning in 1738, Axel Cronstedt  was an unregistered student at   the University of Uppsala, hearing lectures with Johan Gottschalk Wallerius (1709–1785), professor  of  chemistry,  and astronomer Anders  Celsius (1701–1744). At Uppsala, he became a friend of Sven Rinman, discoverer  of Rinman’s green. 
In  1743, during an unstable period politically,   Cronstedt left Uppsala to act as his father's secretary on a military tour of inspection. This tour strengthened his interest in mines and mineralogy.

Cronstedt entered the School of Mines where his instructors included geologist Daniel Tilas (1712-1772). On Tilas' recommendation, Cronstedt went on mining tours in the summers of 1744 and 1745. In 1746, he surveyed copper mines.
From 1746–1748 Cronstedt took classes with George Brandt, the discoverer of cobalt, at the royal mining laboratory in  Stockholm, the Laboratorium Chemicum. There he studied chemical analysis and smelting.

Between 1748, when he completed his studies, and 1758, Cronstedt held a variety of positions. In 1756, he was disappointed to be passed over for a position at the Bureau of Mines, but in 1758, he became a superintendent of mining operations for the mining districts of Öster and Västerbergslagen.

In 1760 Cronstedt married Gertrud Charlotta     Söderhielm (1728–1769). He died there on 19 August 1765.

Research

Cronstedt initiated the use of the blowpipe for the analysis of minerals. Originally a goldsmith's tool, it became widely used for the identification of small ore samples, particularly in Sweden where his contemporaries had seen Cronstedt use it. Use of the blowpipe enabled mineralogists to discover eleven new elements, beginning with Cronstedt's discovery of  nickel.
John Joseph Griffin credits Cronstedt as "the first person of eminence who used the blowpipe" and  "the founder of Mineralogy" in A Practical Treatise on the Use of the Blowpipe (1827).

Cronstedt discovered the mineral now known as scheelite in 1751 at Bispberg Klack, later obtaining samples from the Kuhschacht mine in Freiberg, Germany. He gave it the name tungsten, meaning "heavy stone" in Swedish. Thirty years later, Carl Wilhelm Scheele determined that scheelite was in fact an ore, and that a new metal could be extracted from it. This element then became known by Cronstedt's name, tungsten.

Cronstedt also extracted the element nickel from ores in the cobalt mines of Los, Sweden. The ore was described by miners as kupfernickel because it had a similar appearance to copper (kupfer) and a mischievous sprite (nickel) was supposed by miners to be the cause of their failure to extract copper from it. Cronstedt  presented his research on nickel to the Swedish Academy of Sciences in 1751 and 1754. Decades later, some scientists still argued that it was a mixture, and not a new metal, but its nature was eventually accepted.

In 1756, Cronstedt coined the term zeolite after heating the mineral stilbite with a blowpipe flame. He was the first to describe its distinctive properties, having observed the "frothing" when heated with a blowpipe.

Cronstedt's book Försök  til  mineralogie,  eller  mineral-rikets upställning (“An attempt at mineralogy or arrangement of the  Mineral Kingdom”, 1758) was originally published anonymously. In it, Cronstedt proposed that minerals be classified on the basis of chemical analysis of their composition.  He was surprised that others supported his ideas and put them into practice. It was translated into English by Gustav Von Engeström (1738-1813) as An essay towards a system of mineralogy (1770). Engeström added an appendix, "Description and Use of a Mineralogical Pocket Laboratory; and especially the Use of the Blow-pipe in Mineralogy", which brought considerable attention to Cronstedt's use of the blowpipe.

Cronstedt noted in Försök  til  mineralogie,  eller  mineral-rikets upställning that he had observed an  “unidentified  earth” in a heavy red stone from the Bastnäs mine in Riddarhyttan.  Forty-five years later, Jöns Jacob Berzelius  and  Wilhelm Hisinger isolated the first element of the  lanthanide series of the rare earth elements,  cerium, in ore from the mine.

Awards and honors
In 1753, Cronstedt was elected a member of the Royal Swedish Academy of Sciences.

References

External links 
 

1722 births
1765 deaths
18th-century Swedish chemists
Swedish nobility
Members of the Royal Swedish Academy of Sciences
Discoverers of chemical elements
Rare earth scientists
Axel Fredrik